Homeboys in Outer Space is an American science fiction/fantasy sitcom that aired on UPN from August 27, 1996 to May 13, 1997. The series stars comedian Flex Alexander and Darryl Bell.

Plot
The plot centered around two astronauts, Tyberius "Ty" Walker (Flex) and Morris Clay (Bell), who flew around the universe in a winged car, nicknamed the "Space Hoopty", in the 23rd century.  The duo's car, which was a cross between a lowrider and an 18 wheeler, was piloted by a talking female computer named Loquatia.

Cast

Main cast
Flex as Tyberius "Ty" Walker
Darryl M. Bell as Morris Clay
Rhona Bennett as Loquatia
Kevin Michael Richardson as Vashti
Paulette Braxton as Amma
Michael Colyar as Milky Ray
James Doohan as Pippen

Episodes

Reception
The series was panned by critics. Fredrick L. McKissack, Jr. of The Progressive, in an article on Black-focused television in the 1990s, described the show as "Star Trek meets Amos 'n' Andy." Keith Marder of the Daily News criticized the show for "predictable" jokes and sexual humor, rating it a "C-".

References

External links 

1996 American television series debuts
1997 American television series endings
1990s American comic science fiction television series
Parody television series based on Star Wars
Parodies of Star Trek
English-language television shows
Television series set in the 23rd century
American fantasy television series
Television series by ABC Studios
UPN original programming
1990s American black sitcoms